The Potter/Casey Company Building is a historic commercial building in Aitkin, Minnesota, United States.  It was built in 1902 to house the expanding business of Aitkin County's leading retailer and to lease office space to other businesses on the second floor.  It was listed on the National Register of Historic Places in 1982 for having local significance in the theme of commerce.  It was nominated for representing Aitkin County's most successful commercial enterprise at the turn of the 20th century.

See also
 National Register of Historic Places listings in Aitkin County, Minnesota

References

1902 establishments in Minnesota
Aitkin, Minnesota
Commercial buildings completed in 1902
Commercial buildings on the National Register of Historic Places in Minnesota
National Register of Historic Places in Aitkin County, Minnesota